6-deoxyerythronolide B hydroxylase is an Actinomycetota Cytochrome P450 enzyme originally from Saccharopolyspora erythraea, catalyzes the 6S-hydroxylate of 6-deoxyerythronolide B (6-DEB) to erythronolide B (EB) which is the first step of biosynthesis of the macrolide antibiotic erythromycin. This bacterial enzyme belongs to CYP family CYP107, with the CYP Symbol CYP107A1.

References 

Cytochrome P450
EC 1.14.15
Prokaryote genes